Robert Wayne Hansen (April 29, 1911 – June 9, 1997) was an American lawyer and jurist, and was a justice of the Wisconsin Supreme Court.

Early life
Born in Milwaukee, Wisconsin, Hansen graduated from Marquette University Law School in 1933.  He was a devoted member of the Fraternal Order of Eagles, and served as the order's National President and editor of the order's national magazine.

In 1951, Hansen became chief examiner of the Milwaukee Board of Fire and Police Commissioners, and served in that role until he was appointed to the Milwaukee County District Court in 1954, by Governor Walter J. Kohler, Jr. He was elected in 1960 to the newly created 13th Milwaukee county branch of the 2nd Circuit of Wisconsin Courts, defeating Irene Gyzinski. The 13th branch was created as the family court division in Milwaukee county. He served from 1961 to 1968, winning re-election 1965 without opposition.

Wisconsin Supreme Court
In 1967, he was elected to the Wisconsin Supreme Court, defeating the incumbent Chief Justice, George R. Currie. It was the first time that a sitting Wisconsin Chief Justice had been defeated for re-election. During the campaign, Hansen had pointed out that even if Currie had been re-elected, he would have to retire after two years due to the mandatory retirement law that was then in-effect for Wisconsin judges.  Hansen served his ten-year term and did not seek re-election, noting that the same mandatory retirement law would impact him in only a few years if he were re-elected.  His term ended July 31, 1977.

Later years
Hansen and his wife Dorothy had four children.  Justice Hansen died June 9, 1997.

Electoral history

Wisconsin Circuit Court (1960, 1965)

Wisconsin Supreme Court (1967)

Notes

Politicians from Milwaukee
Marquette University Law School alumni
Wisconsin state court judges
Justices of the Wisconsin Supreme Court
1911 births
1997 deaths
20th-century American judges
Lawyers from Milwaukee
20th-century American lawyers